Xela Arias Castaño (1962 in Lugo – 2003 in Vigo) was a Spanish Galician-language poet and translator.

She translated works by  Jorge Amado, Camilo Castelo Branco, James Joyce, Fenimore Cooper and Wenceslao Fernández Flórez into Galician.

Works 
Denuncia do equilibrio, 1986
Tigres coma cabalos, 1990
Darío a diario, 1996
Intempériome, 2003

External links
Revista de la UCM

1962 births
2003 deaths
20th-century Spanish poets
21st-century Spanish poets
Galician poets
Galician translators
Translators from Spanish
Translators from English
Translators to Galician
Galician-language writers
20th-century translators
21st-century translators
Spanish women poets
20th-century Spanish women writers
21st-century Spanish women writers
People from Lugo